On 25 February 2014, following the 2013 Nepalese Constituent Assembly election, the Nepali Congress Party formed a government out of the 2nd Nepalese Constituent Assembly led by Sushil Koirala and backed by the Communist Party of Nepal (Unified Marxist–Leninist). The cabinet consisted of 11 ministers from the Nepali Congress Party, 11 ministers from the Communist Party of Nepal (Unified Marxist–Leninist), one minister of the Unified Communist Party of Nepal (Maoist), two ministers of the Rastriya Prajatantra Party and five ministers from other parties.

Ministers

References

Government of Nepal
Cabinet of Nepal
2013 in Nepal
2014 establishments in Nepal
2015 disestablishments in Nepal